Barfield may refer to:

People
 Doug Barfield
 Jesse Barfield
 Josh Barfield
 Owen Barfield 
 Ron Barfield
 Velma Barfield
 Warren Barfield

Places
Barfield, Alabama, an unincorporated community in Clay County, Alabama
Barfield, Arkansas
Barfield, Tennessee

Other
Barfield, an aircraft maintenance company 
Barfield, a skit parodying Garfield from the television show, Loiter Squad

See also
 Barford (disambiguation)